Hasanabad-e Shandak (also Romanized as Hasanābād-e Shandak; also known as Shāndak, Shandak, Shandak Ghal‘eh Bīd, Shandak Morad Abad, and Shandaq) is a village in Gowhar Kuh Rural District, Nukabad District, Khash County, Sistan and Baluchestan Province, Iran. At the 2006 census, its population was 27, in 5 families.

References 

Populated places in Khash County